New Jersey Transit operates the following local bus routes within Atlantic County, centered on Atlantic City that were once operated by Atlantic City Transportation Company. All of these routes are exact fare lines (except for 510) and are operated out of the Egg Harbor garage.

Routes
The full route is shown below except for branching. School routes are not listed.

Former routes
In the past, New Jersey Transit ran shuttle routes running from the Atlantic City Rail Terminal to casinos in Atlantic City, numbered 506 and 510-513, connecting Atlantic City Line customers to casino destinations. All of these routes are now operated by the Atlantic City Jitney Association using either jitneys or dedicated minibuses.  Note: Destinations indicated in chart below reflect names of casinos at the time of the ACJA takeover in the mid-1990s.

See also
Atlantic City Jitney Association - a provider of local bus service solely within Atlantic City

External links
New Jersey Transit - Bus
Unofficial New Jersey Transit bus map

 500
Lists of New Jersey bus routes
Atlantic City, New Jersey